Al-Sīra al-Nabawiyya, commonly shortened to Sīrah and translated as prophetic biography, are the traditional Muslim biographies of Muhammad from which, in addition to the Quran and Hadiths, most historical information about his life and the early period of Islam is derived.

Etymology
In the Arabic language the word sīra or sīrat comes from the verb sāra, which means to travel or to be on a journey. A person's sīra is that person's journey through life, or biography, encompassing their birth, events in their life, manners and characteristics, and their death. In modern usage it may also refer to a person's resume. It is sometimes written as "seera", "sirah" or "sirat", all meaning "life" or "journey". In Islamic literature, the plural form, siyar, could also refer to the rules of war and dealing with non-Muslims.

The phrase sīrat rasūl allāh, or as-sīra al-nabawiyya, refers to the study of the life of Muhammad. The term sīra was first linked to the biography of Muhammad by Ibn Shihab al-Zuhri, and later popularized by the work of Ibn Hisham. In the first two centuries of Islamic history, sīra was more commonly known as maghāzī (literally, stories of military expeditions), which is now considered to be only a subset of sīra—one that concerns the military campaigns of Muhammad.

Early works of sīra consist of multiple historical reports, or akhbār, and each report is called a khabar. Sometimes the word tradition or hadith is used instead.

Content
The sīra literature includes a variety of heterogeneous materials, containing mainly narratives of military expeditions undertaken by Muhammad and his companions. These stories are intended as historical accounts and are used for veneration. The sīra also includes a number of written documents, such as political treaties (e.g., Treaty of Hudaybiyyah or Constitution of Medina), military enlistments, assignments of officials, letters to foreign rulers, and so forth. It also records some of the speeches and sermons made by Muhammad, like his speech at the Farewell Pilgrimage. Some of the sīra accounts include verses of poetry commemorating certain events and battles.

At later periods, certain type of stories included in sīra developed into their own separate genres. One genre is concerned with stories of prophetic miracles, called aʿlām al-nubuwa (literally, "proofs of prophethood"—the first word is sometimes substituted for amārāt or dalāʾil). Another genre, called faḍāʾil wa mathālib — tales that show the merits and faults of individual companions, enemies, and other notable contemporaries of Muhammad. Some works of sīra also positioned the story of Muhammad as part of a narrative that includes stories of earlier prophets, Persian Kings, pre-Islamic Arab tribes, and the Rashidun.

Parts of sīra were inspired by, or elaborate upon, events mentioned in the Qur'an. These parts were often used by writers of tafsir and asbab al-nuzul to provide background information for events mentioned in certain ayat.

Comparison to hadith

In terms of structure, a hadith and a historical report (khabar) are very similar; they both contain isnads (chains of transmission). The main difference between a hadith and a khabar is that a hadith is not concerned with an event as such, and normally does not specify a time or place. Rather the purpose of hadith is to record a religious doctrine as an authoritative source of Islamic law. By contrast, while a khabar may carry some legal or theological implications, its main aim is to convey information about a certain event.

Starting from the 8th and 9th century, many scholars have devoted their efforts to both kinds of texts equally. Some historians consider the sīra and maghāzī literature to be a subset of Hadith.

Reception

During the early centuries of Islam, the sīra literature was taken less seriously compared to the hadiths. In Umayyad times, storytellers (qāṣṣ, pl. quṣṣāṣ) used to tell stories of Muhammad and earlier prophets in private gatherings and mosques, given they obtained permission from the authorities. Many of these storytellers are now unknown. After the Umayyad period, their reputation deteriorated because of their inclination to exaggerate and fantasize, and for relying on the Isra'iliyat. Thus they were banned from preaching at mosques. In later periods, however, works of sīra became more prominent. More recently, Western historical criticism and debate concerning sīra have elicited a defensive attitude from some Muslims who wrote apologetic literature defending its content.

Authenticity

For centuries, Muslim scholars have recognized the problem of authenticity of hadith. Thus they have developed sophisticated methods (see Hadith studies) of evaluating isnāds (chains of transmission). This was done in order to classify each hadith into "sound" (ṣaḥīḥ) for authentic reports, as opposed to "weak" (ḍaʿīf) for ones that are probably fabricated, in addition to other categories. Since many sīra reports also contain isnād information and some of the sīra compilers (akhbārīs) were themselves practicing jurists and hadīth transmitters (muḥaddiths), it was possible to apply the same methods of hadīth criticism to the sīra reports. However, some sīra reports were written using an imprecise form of isnād, or what modern historians call the "collective isnād" or "combined reports". The use of collective isnād meant that a report may be related on the authority of multiple persons without distinguishing the words of one person from another. This lack of precision led some hadith scholars to take any report that used a collective isnād to be lacking in authenticity.

According to Wim Raven, it is often noted that a coherent image of Muhammad cannot be formed from the literature of sīra, whose authenticity and factual value have been questioned on a number of different grounds. He lists the following arguments against the authenticity of sīra, followed here by counter arguments:

 Hardly any sīra work was compiled during the first century of Islam. However, Fred Donner points out that the earliest historical writings about the origins of Islam first emerged in AH 60–70, well within the first century of Hijra (see also List of biographies of Muhammad). Furthermore, the sources now extant, dating from the second, third, and fourth centuries AH, are mostly compilations of material derived from earlier sources.
 The many discrepancies exhibited in different narrations found in sīra works. Yet, despite the lack of a single orthodoxy in Islam, there is still a marked agreement on the most general features of the traditional origins story.
 Later sources claiming to know more about the time of Muhammad than earlier ones. Scholar Patricia Crone found a pattern, where the farther a commentary was removed in time from the life of Muhammad and the events in the Quran, the more information it provided, despite the fact it depended on the earlier sources for its content.  Crone attributed this phenomenon to storytellers' embellishment.If one storyteller should happen to mention a raid, the next storyteller would know the date of this raid, while the third would know everything that an audience might wish to hear about. In the case of Ibn Ishaq, there are no earlier sources we can consult to see if and how much embroidering was done by him and other earlier transmitters, but, Crone argues, "it is hard to avoid the conclusion that in the three generations between the Prophet and Ibn Ishaq" fictitious details were not also added.
 Discrepancies compared to non-Muslim sources. But there are also similarities and agreements both in information specific to Muhammad, and concerning Muslim tradition at large.
 Some parts or genres of sīra, namely those dealing with miracles, do not qualify as sources for scientific historiographical information about Muhammad, except for showing the beliefs and doctrines of his community.

Nevertheless, other content of sīra, like the Constitution of Medina, are generally considered to be authentic.

Early compilations of sīra

The following is a list of some of the early Hadith collectors who specialized in collecting and compiling sīra and maghāzī reports:

 ʿUrwa ibn al-Zubayr (d. 713). He wrote letters replying to inquiries of the Umayyad caliphs, Abd al-Malik ibn Marwan and al-Walid I, involving questions about certain events that happened in the time of the Prophet. Since Abd al-Malik did not appreciate the maghāzī literature, these letters were not written in story form. He is not known to have written any books on the subject.
 Wahb ibn Munabbih (d. during 725 to 737). Several books were ascribed to him but none of them are now extant. Some of his works survive as quotations found in works by Ibn Ishaq, Ibn Hisham, Ibn Jarir al-Tabari, and Abū Nuʿaym al-Iṣfahānī.
 Ibn Shihāb al-Zuhrī (d. c. 737), a central figure in sīra literature, who collected both ahadith and akhbār. His akhbār also contain chains of transmissions, or isnad. He was sponsored by the Umayyad court and asked to write two books, one on genealogy and another on maghāzī. The first was canceled and the one about maghāzī is either not extant or has never been written.
 Musa ibn ʿUqba, a student of al-Zuhrī, wrote Kitāb al-Maghāzī, a notebook used to teach his students; now lost. Some of his traditions have been preserved, although their attribution to him is disputed.
 Muhammad ibn Ishaq (d. 767 or 761), another student of al-Zuhrī, who collected oral traditions that formed the basis of an important biography of the Prophet. His traditions survived through a number of sources, most notably Ibn Hisham and Ibn Jarir al-Tabari.

See also

 Biographical evaluation (ʿIlm al-rijāl)
 Hadith
 Historiography of early Islam
 List of biographies of Muhammad
 List of hadith collections
 Sunnah

Notes

References

Further reading

 
 Hagen, Gottfried, Sira, Ottoman Turkish, in Muhammad in History, Thought, and Culture: An Encyclopedia of the Prophet of God (2 vols.), Edited by C. Fitzpatrick and A. Walker, Santa Barbara, ABC-CLIO, 2014, Vol. II, pp. 585–597. .
 Jarar, Maher, Sira (Biography), in Muhammad in History, Thought, and Culture: An Encyclopedia of the Prophet of God (2 vols.), Edited by C. Fitzpatrick and A. Walker, Santa Barbara, ABC-CLIO, 2014, Vol. II, pp. 568–582. .
 Williams, Rebecca, Sira, Modern English, in Muhammad in History, Thought, and Culture: An Encyclopedia of the Prophet of God (2 vols.), Edited by C. Fitzpatrick and A. Walker, Santa Barbara, ABC-CLIO, 2014, Vol. II, pp. 582–585. 

Biographies of Muhammad
Islamic terminology